was a science fiction toyline created, manufactured and marketed by Takara Co., Ltd. from 1974 to 1984 as well as from 1998 to 2007. The Microman line was a series of  action figures with accompanying vehicles, robots, playsets and accessories. Unlike other toylines at the time, Microman figures were marketed as being the "actual" size of cyborg beings called "Micros" that hailed from a fictional planet known as "Micro Earth" and disguised themselves as action figures while on planet Earth.

Description

The core of the Microman line consisted of  action figures which were known for their high number of articulation points relative to other toys of similar size/scale in the 1970s. The toyline also included vehicles, robots, playsets and accessories. Many of the Microman toys used interchangeable  connectors and ports that allowed parts to be transferred and connected between different toys.

The Microman toyline was licensed and released in the United States by Mego Corporation as the Micronauts from 1976–1980.

Some of the transforming Microman toys and vehicles from the Micro Change series created within the 1980s New Microman toyline were licensed by Hasbro, along with other similar transforming toys from Takara's Diaclone toyline, in the 1980s to be a part of Hasbro's Transformers toyline in the United States.

History

Classic Microman (1974–1980)

Takara first released Microman toys in Japan in 1974 as a smaller version of their popular  &  1972 Henshin Cyborg (Transforming Cyborg) line. Henshin Cyborg figures were based on  &  Combat Joe figures — which themselves were based on Hasbro's G.I. Joe figures — with their bodies molded in clear plastic, exposing their inner workings and supposed cybernetic parts.

By downscaling their size, Takara sought to create the Microman line to offset the sheer cost of producing a full line of plastic-based  &  figures and related playsets as well as acknowledging that basic living space is limited—and considered a premium—to most Japanese households. Smaller Microman figures would not only cost less to produce during the energy crisis of the 1970s, the line's smaller scale would also take up less physical space in a household and thus be more attractive to space conscious consumers in the Japanese market.

Microman Zone (1974)

The first 1974 series of toys was called Microman Zone and included four figures and several vehicles such as the MIC-1 Space Buggy, MIC-2 Bulk Lifter, MIC-3 Sky Roader and the M115 Conning Tower Base. Additional vehicles were sold as "Micro-Kit Machine Series" sets which required assembly prior to use.

Project Victory (1975)

Following the success of the first 1974 Microman Zone series, Takara completely revamped and expanded the Microman concept to be a stand-alone line on its own and not merely a smaller-scale version of their Henshin Cyborg line. The former original Microman figures were now given sturdier "cybernetic feet" and all figures now contained standard  ports which allowed for interchangeability between sets and figures. Takara also introduced a new line of die-cast figures dubbed Super Steel Microman and a new line of "enemy" figures dubbed the Acroyears. Additionally, all figures were now identified by a new alphanumeric figure-type designation system—such as M10X, M11X, M12X, M20X, M21X, M22X, etc.—across the whole line as well being given formal, character names such as George (M101), Jack (M102), Jesse (M103) and John (M104).

Spy Magician (1976)

In addition to new vehicles and figures such as Spy Magician (M13X & M14X), Takara introduced a new class of figure dubbed the Titans which employed a magnetic ball/joint system that allowed for a new level of interchangeability between toys. Japanese pop-culture character tie-in toys were also released (such as Microman Jeeg, Robotman Gakeen and Robotman Mechadon) which helped expand Takara's line beyond its own in-house characters and opened the door to greater licensing opportunities for their designs.

Microman Command (1977)

A Microman manga was published in TV Magazine, a children’s oriented magazine published by Kodansha Ltd., in 1977. Takara also introduced the Microman Command line in which each figure came in its own unique capsule case (shaped like Easter Island figures, the Statue of Liberty, etc.) and included the first female figure, Lady Command (M18X), in the line.

Police Keeper (1978)

With the release of Star Wars in 1977, the market for science fiction merchandise became increasingly filled with competing science fiction related products. New figures such as the Police Keeper (M23X), Micro Knight MC-X and Cosmo Satan Arden (A35X) built on the success of prior Microman action figure releases. Takara’s attempts to expand the Microman line concept with the Micro Hoodman (H70X) and construction/building playset Play Build line of toys with the large-sized Build Base playset were not well received. Lack of a positive response to the new line was strong enough that previously announced toys in the line, such as the remote control Hoodman spaceship Hoodman's RCB Noah, were cancelled.

Rescue Command (1979)

Takara attempted to revive the line with the new Rescue Command series of toys and action figures. At the core of the Rescue Command was the new Rescue Secret Base and a new background story on the Rescue Command that explained the whole "rescue" theme of the whole line.

Punch & Blizzard Man (1980)

Takara moved away from releasing  figures and instead concentrated on larger-sized toys, robots and sets that all contained some sort of "gimmick" to them. Gimmicks included the Microman Punch (P.0X) figure whose arm could be wound up to "punch" and Microman Blizzard (B-X) series of figures that contained a battery-powered fan.

Microman  action figures (1974–1980)

Below is a basic overview list documenting classic Microman  action figure releases from 1974 to 1980. This is not meant to be a comprehensive list of all classic Microman  releases/variants but rather a high-level overview of  Takara’s   Microman line offerings.

New Microman (1981–1984)

While a line of new Microman  figures were released for the 1980 New Microman line, their history was completely different from the figures that preceded them in the previous Microman line. The new line consisted of 10 Microman figures that came in molded capsules. There was now a greater focus on the Micro Robot series of toys as well as larger robot-oriented playsets.

New Microman (1981)

While a line of new Microman  figures were released for the 1980 New Microman line, their history was completely different from the figures that preceded them in the previous Microman line. The new line consisted of 10 Microman figures that came in molded capsules. There was now a greater focus on the Micro Robot series of toys as well as larger robot-oriented playsets.

Micro Robot (1982)

Takara’s focus of the 1982 line was on the new Micro Borg and Micro Robot toys. While the Micro Robot W Box Set came with a New Microman M004 Eiji (Blue) figure, these figures were only available in the box set and not as individual figures.

Micro Change (1983)

In 1983, Takara introduced a new Microman toyline called Micro Change. The Micro Change toys were seemingly ordinary items, such as cassette tapes, a microscope, watches and even guns, that could change into other forms to help Microman in their fight against the Acroyears. While the focus of the line had shifted away from the original Microman action figures, Takara released one last figure, dubbed Salam (M011).

Micro Change to Transformers (1984)

1984 saw the end of the Micro Change/Microman line with no new figures released that year. After seeing the success Hasbro had combining Takara’s Diaclone and Micro Change lines into the Transformers toyline in the U.S. market, Takara decided to end both the Diaclone and Micro Change toylines and instead focus their efforts on releasing their own Japanese versions of the Transformers.

New Microman  action figures (1981–1984)

Below is a basic overview list documenting New Microman  action figure releases from 1981 to 1984. This is not meant to be a comprehensive list of all New Microman action figure releases/variants but rather a high-level overview of Takara’s  New Microman line offerings.

Microman 21 Series (1996–1997)

From 1996 to 1997, a small Japanese hobby toy company named Romando acquired a provisional license from Takara to reissue vintage Microman figures. This series was known as the Microman 21 series since the release of these reissues coincided with the 21st anniversary of the original Microman series. Action figures reissued as a part of the Microman 21 series were figures in the Microman Command (M15x), Microman Command (M16x), Microman Rescue (M25x), Micro Knight MC-X, Spy Magician (M13X) lines of figures.

Micro Millennium Series (1998–2003)

In 1999, Takara produced a whole new line of Microman toys and reissued older Microman figures. The new Microman series was divided into two distinct lines: the Magne Powers and LED Powers series and the Replica Microman series based on the success of Romando’s previous reissues under their brand name..

Replica Microman (1998–2003)

The Replica Microman series was mainly aimed at adult collectors and older fans of the original toyline. This series launched in 1998 with the Microman Founder (M10X) series which reissued the Microman (M10X) figures. That release was soon followed by the reissue of many other classic Microman figures such as Acroyear (A30X), Spy Magician (M14X), Lady Command (M18X) and others. In addition to reissuing versions that adhered to the original, vintage Microman color combinations, Takara also released several newly created, limited edition color variants with new character names and designations to add to the canon of the old series

As the series progressed in the 2000s Takara continued to release more Replica Microman reissues as well as even more limited edition and exclusive color variants. While increasing variety of available product, this resulted in the Microman market becoming saturated with so many unsold, variants that by 2001 Takara decided to significantly scale back the release of the Replica Microman. By 2003 the Replica Microman series continued to put out releases but only on a very limited basis and mainly through Takara’s e-Hobby Shop.

Magne Powers & LED Powers (1998–2000)

On December 26, 1998, Takara officially launched the Magne Powers series which was followed in 2000 by the companion LED Powers series. The Magne Powers series and LED Powers series were designed for children with brand new toy designs and a new story line which included a Microman anime series. In addition to the anime, Takara also commissioned manga serial for Comic BomBom magazine.

By 2000, Takara, which was dealing with financial issues, reduced their new LED Powers series to a few dozen of toys and canceled the Microman anime series as well as the manga in Comic BomBom magazine. Soon afterwards, Takara would put all of their new Microman properties on indefinite hiatus.

Microman Force Series (2003–2007)

In 2003, Takara decided to test Microman market again with a brand new series of action figures called Microman 2003 which was aimed towards collectors and older fans.

In the late 2000s, Takara expanded the overall Microman brand and Microman 2003 line to include various licensed brands, including Batman (both comic based and from Batman Begins), Superman (both comic based and from Superman Returns), Evangelion, Street Fighter, Godzilla, Alien vs Predator and Kinnikuman. A Spider-Man toy was announced at one point and a photograph of a prototype does exist. However, the figure was never produced, and its product number was assigned to a Predator figure.

Microman toyline influence outside Japan

Micronauts (1976–1980)

In the late 1970s, the U.S. toy company Mego acquired the license for some of Takara’s Microman  toys and released them in the United States as the Micronauts. Mego manufactured and marketed Micronaut toys from 1976 to 1980 prior to the company’s bankruptcy and dissolution in 1982. After Mego’s demise, other toy companies such as Palisades Toys and SOTA (State of the Art) Toys attempted to revive the toyline over the years.

Transformers (1984–present)

In 1981 Takara produced a new Microman line called New Microman. A few years later in 1983, Takara launched a new Microman series within the New Microman line dubbed Micro Change. The line featured toys that were seemingly ordinary items (such as cassette tapes, microscopes, watches and even guns) that could transform themselves and "change" into other forms to help Microman in their fight against the Acroyears.

In 1984 Hasbro acquired the license for the transforming object toys from Takara’s Micro Change toyline as well as similar transforming Takara toys in the Diaclone toyline and the two were combined by Hasbro to create the Transformers toyline.

Below is a table showing which Transformers were based on which Micro Change toys and their variants:

Microman related anime & manga

Microman Kodansha TV Magazine manga (1978–79)

In 1977 TV Magazine—a children’s oriented magazine published by Kodansha Ltd.—began publishing an official, Takara approved serialized Microman manga drawn by manga artist Yoshihiro Moritou. This serialized manga was compiled into six volumes released from 1978 to 1979. Additionally, a set of 30 Menko cards featuring Moritou’s manga versions of Microman characters and vehicles was released during that period as well.

Microman Secret File Volume 1 catalog and manga (1984)

By 1984 Takara was continuing the trend of focusing their New Microman line away from the core  Microman action figures to robots and other items. Specifically, their new focus was on their line of transformable items in the Micro Change line. Technically Microman Secret File Volume 1 was not a traditional, stand-alone manga one could purchase on their own; it was a combination catalog and manga that was packaged with a few of the new toys in the 1984 Micro Change toyline such as MC-19: Binocular Robo Scope Man. Its purpose was to establish the new direction of the Microman toyline and place the new Micro Change line in proper context within the larger Microman universe. The manga portion of the Microman Secret File Volume 1 contained artwork by Yoshihiro Moritou; the manga artist who created the original Kodansha TV Magazine manga in the 1970s.

Hasbro’s new Transformers toyline and related storyline would supersede many of the concepts and ideas presented in Microman Secret File Volume 1.

Microman: The Small Giant Comic BomBom manga (1998–1999)

From October 1998 to December 1999 Comic BomBom serialized a new manga based on Takara’s new 1998 Magne Powers & LED Powers Microman toylines drawn by manga artist Hisashi Matsumoto. This manga was subsequently compiled into stand-alone volumes and released by Kodansha Ltd. The plot focused on a school boy who receives a package that contains five small action figures that begin to move on their own and start to talk to him. They introduce themselves as Microman, hailing from the planet "Micro Earth" and were sent to Earth to help save the planet.

Microman: The Small Giant Studio Pierrot anime (1999)

A Microman anime adaption was created by Studio Pierrot, based on the toys and the manga created by Hisashi Matsumoto and serialized in Comic BomBom, and ran from January 4, 1999 to December 27, 1999 on TV Tokyo. The series was subsequently released on VHS and DVD by Pioneer LDC. A companion theatrical movie based on the anime TV series was released in 1999 as well. A PlayStation game related to the series, Chou Jiryoku Senshi Microman: Generation 2000, developed by Barnhouse Effect and published by Takara, was released in Japan on December 16, 1999.

See Also
 Chiisana Kyojin Microman
 A PlayStation game based on the franchise, developed by Wavedge and published by Takara, released in Japan on March 11, 1999.
 DreamMix TV World Fighters
 A crossover fighting game featuring M121 Mason as a playable character (with other Microman characters available as alternate colors)

References

1998 manga
1999 anime television series debuts
1970s toys
1980s toys
1990s toys
2000s toys
Action figures
Kodansha manga
Mass media franchises introduced in 1974
Pierrot (company)
Takara video games
Takara Tomy
Takara Tomy franchises
Transforming toy robots
TV Tokyo original programming
1974 establishments in Japan